The FC Basel 1921–22 season was their twenty-ninth season since the club's foundation on 15 November 1893. The club's chairman was Carl Burkhardt who took over from Franz Rinderer at the club's AGM. FC Basel played their home games in the Landhof in the district Wettstein in Kleinbasel.

Overview 
Basel played a total of 28 matches in their 1921–22 season. 14 of these were in the domestic league, one in the Och Cup and 13 were friendly matches. Of these 13 friendlies, seven were home games played in the Landhof and six were away games. Basel played eight of their friendly games against German opponents. The pre-season match on 6 August was a challenge match for the Feldberg Cup. The game took place on an improvised football field (swamp, ditch and rocks). After an hour, the game was abandoned and the Cup awarded to the Freiburger FC by toss of a coin. During the winter break Basel made a short journey to Germany and played one game against the Würzburger Kickers and one in Frankfurt am Main against 1. FFC Germania 1894. On the 1 April they travelled to Hamburg and played SC Victoria. Basel were also hosts for Czech team Sparta Prague, Hungarian Újpesti Dózsa and French team Mulhouse. Four test games ended in a victory, four were drawn and five ended in a defeat. In these tests Basel scored a total of 26 goals and conceded 33.

The domestic league, Swiss Serie A 1921–22, was divided into three regional groups, East, Central and West, each group with eight teams. FC Basel and the two other teams from Basel Nordstern and Old Boys were allocated to the Central group. The other teams playing in this group were Aarau, Luzern and Biel-Bienne and the two teams from the capital, Young Boys and FC Bern. FC Basel played a mediocre season, 14 matches, winning six matches, drawing three and suffering five defeats, scoring 20 goals and conceding 21. With 15 points they ended the season in third position. Kuhn was the team's top league goal scorer with 8 goals. In the home game against Luzern on 27 November 1921 he managed a hattrick. Despite this Luzern won the group and continued to the finals. Servette won the championship.

In the first round of the Och Cup, that had been newly created the year before, and is considered as the forerunner to the Swiss Cup, Basel played an away game against lower tier FC Olten. Basel lost 4–0 and were eliminated. The final was played on 6 August 1922 between Basel's lower tier rivals Concordia Basel and Étoile-Sporting. Concordia won 1–0 to win the trophy.

Players 
Squad members

Results 

Legend

Friendly matches

Pre-season and mid-season

Winter break and mid-season

Serie A

Central Group results

Central Group table

Och Cup

See also
 History of FC Basel
 List of FC Basel players
 List of FC Basel seasons

References

Sources 
 Rotblau: Jahrbuch Saison 2014/2015. Publisher: FC Basel Marketing AG. 
 Die ersten 125 Jahre. Publisher: Josef Zindel im Friedrich Reinhardt Verlag, Basel. 
 FCB squad 1921–22 at fcb-archiv.ch
(NB: Despite all efforts, the editors of these books and the authors in "Basler Fussballarchiv" have failed to be able to identify all the players, their date and place of birth or date and place of death, who played in the games during the early years of FC Basel.)
 Switzerland 1921-22 at RSSSF

External links
 FC Basel official site

FC Basel seasons
Basel